The Police and Prisons Civil Rights Union (POPCRU) is a trade union in South Africa representing police officers, traffic officers and correctional officers, it has around 120,000 members. POPCRU was formed in 1989.

History
On 5 September 1989, a group of black officers in the South African Police defied orders and refused to attack anti-apartheid protesters.  Some of them worked with a group of prison warders to found POPCRU, in November.  The new unions was unable to secure recognition, with many of its leaders being dismissed, and some being imprisoned.  In 1993, it finally achieved recognition.

POPCRU is an affiliate of the Congress of South African Trade Unions (COSATU).

Leadership

General Secretaries
Jacob Tsumane
2000s: Abbey Witbooi
2007: Nathi Theledi

Presidents
1989: Gregory Rockman
1990s: Johnny Jansen
1996: Zizamele Cebekhulu

References

Trade unions based in Johannesburg
Congress of South African Trade Unions
World Federation of Trade Unions
Trade unions established in 1989
Trade unions in South Africa